Boyer State Forest covers  in Berlin, Vermont in Washington County. The forest is managed by the Vermont Department of Forests, Parks, and Recreation.

Activities in the forest include hiking, mountain biking, cross-country skiing, snowshoeing, hunting and wildlife viewing.

References

External links
Official website

Vermont state forests
Protected areas of Washington County, Vermont
Berlin, Vermont